Hsu Jan-yau (born 8 August 1951) is a Taiwanese politician and current chairman of the Taiwan Stock Exchange.

Education
Hsu obtained his bachelor's degree in accounting and statistics from National Cheng Kung University in 1974 and master's degree in statistics from National Chengchi University in 1976.

Political career
Hsu was named a minister without portfolio in April 2016 and took office on 20 May. On 1 July, he was appointed Chairperson of the Provincial Government of Taiwan Province. Hsu served until November 2017, when he was named chairman of the Taiwan Stock Exchange.

References

Chairpersons of the Taiwan Provincial Government
Living people
1951 births
Politicians of the Republic of China on Taiwan from Kaohsiung
National Chengchi University alumni
National Cheng Kung University alumni